Carmen Angulo (born September 17, 1970) is an Ecuadorian actress.

Biography
Carmen Angulo was born in Guayaquil on September 17, 1970, to an Afro-Ecuadorian family.

She studied social communication at the University of Guayaquil's Faculty of Social Sciences (FACSO), but dropped out in her third year to raise a family.

Career

Television

She was on the dramatization program , and made a special appearance on the telenovela .

On TC Televisión, she played Leticia on the comedy series , and later played Mónica on the telenovela .

She was also a member of the cast of the comedy Los Tostadams, a parody of The Addams Family, which was initially part of the program .

From 2013 to 2015, Angulo appeared on the telenovela Secretarias. On the comic series Los Hijos de Don Juan, she played Madame Trouché.

Film
In 2007, Angulo was cast in the film El milagro de coromoto, the story of a religious miracle set in 17th-century Venezuela.

In 2011, she appeared in the successful low-budget film , directed by Fernando Mieles.

Theater
Angulo is part of the theatrical group Los compadritos del Parque Histórico, which works to preserve the culture of the Montubio and Afro-Ecuadorians.

Other works
Angulo is a member of the Casa de la Cultura Ecuatoriana, and taught at a nursery school for the Central Bank's foundation El muchacho trabajador, with the aim of eradicating child labor.

In 2012, Angulo announced that she, together with model Alexandra Mora and dancer Stalyn Vera, would be opening an art school named MAD in Babahoyo.

Filmography

TV series and telenovelas
 Blanco y negro (2000)
  (2001-2005)
  (2004)
  (2005)
  (2008-2009) ... Ginger's mother
  (2010-2011) ... Mónica
  (2011) ... Leticia
 Los Tostadams (2012) ... Grandmother
 Secretarias (2013-2015) ... Monze
 Los Hijos de Don Juan (2015-2016) ... Madame Trouché
  (2017-2018) ... Angelina Youlín Nazareno
 Maleteados (2018) ... Bella
  (2019) ... Melina Molina
  (2020) ... Maritza Rizos

Film
 El milagro de Coromoto (2006) ... Ana
  (2011)

References

External links
 

1970 births
Ecuadorian film actresses
Ecuadorian stage actresses
Ecuadorian telenovela actresses
Living people
People from Guayaquil
21st-century Ecuadorian women